

1990

Non-circulating coins

1991

Non-circulating coins

1992

Non-circulating coins

1993

Non-circulating coins

1994

Non-circulating coins

1995

Non-circulating coins

1996

Non-circulating coins

1997

Non-circulating coins

1998

Non-circulating coins

1999

Non-circulating coins

Circulating coins

Notes 

  This is a non-circulating variety of a circulating coin.

References 

Commemorative coins of the United States